Teoh Yi Peng (born 4 May 1988) is a Singaporean cyclist. He participated in the time trial in the 2017 UCI Road World Championships, the 2017 Southeast Asian Games (SEA Games), and in the 2018 Sri Lanka T-Cup. He also served on Singapore's men's team for the SEA games in 2017.

Major results

2016 
 3rd National Singapore Road Race Championships
 5th National Singapore ITT Championships

2017 
 2nd National Road Race Championships
 43rd UCI Road World Championships
 26th Southeast Asia Games

2018 
12th Asian Cycling Championships - ITT

References

1988 births
Living people
Singaporean male cyclists
Singaporean sportspeople of Chinese descent